The 1976 Monaco Grand Prix (formally the XXXIV Grand Prix de Monaco) was a Formula One motor race held at the Monaco street circuit in Monaco on 30 May 1976. It was the sixth round of the 1976 Formula One season and the 34th Monaco Grand Prix. The race was contested over 78 laps of the 3.3 km circuit for a race distance of 257 kilometres.

The race was won by Ferrari driver Niki Lauda, who had also taken pole position in his Ferrari 312T2.

Qualifying

Qualifying classification 

*Drivers with a red background all failed to qualify as the grid was limited to 20 places.

Race 
Lauda won by 11 seconds over Jody Scheckter driving the six-wheeled Tyrrell P34, whilst Scheckter's teammate, Patrick Depailler, completed the podium in third. As a consequence of the race, Lauda extended his lead in the World Drivers' Championship to 36 points over his teammate Clay Regazzoni who had retired after starting second, going off track on oil laid down when James Hunt retired with a blown engine on lap 25, climbing back to third before crashing.

A lap down in fourth was the March 761 of Hans-Joachim Stuck with the McLaren M23 of Jochen Mass and the Fittipaldi FD04 of Emerson Fittipaldi completing the point scoring positions.

Race classification

Championship standings after the race
Points are accurate at the conclusion of the race and do not reflect final results of the 1976 Spanish Grand Prix as it was under appeal.

Drivers' Championship standings

Constructors' Championship standings

Note: Only the top five positions are included for both sets of standings.

References

Monaco Grand Prix
Monaco Grand Prix
Grand Prix